Transindex is a Hungarian on-line newspaper published in Romania.

External links 
Transindexs website

Publications with year of establishment missing
Hungarian-language newspapers published in Romania